MKVV International Vidyalaya, mkvviv, or Matushri Kashiben Vrajlal Valia International Vidyalaya, formerly known as BES International Vidyalaya, is a private, CBSE affiliated school in Borivali, Mumbai, India.

History 

M.K.V.V. International Vidyalaya is an offspring of the Borivli Education Society which is a registered body.

The school was established on 21 June 1999, under the guidance and vision of Shri. Vinubhai Valia, who has been the President of Borivali Education Society for the last 25 years.

The foundation of  the school was laid by the Director, Shri. Shantilal M. Shah.

Academics 

The school is affiliated to Central Board of Secondary Education up to Std.XII. It is a co-educational school from Nursery to Class XII.

As per the CBSE norms, the students are introduced to a third language in their sixth grade. The school offers a choice between Sanskrit and French. As the students proceed to their ninth grade and are relieved of one language (as per CBSE norms), they may choose from Hindi, Sanskrit and French.

The school offers medical, non-medical and commerce to its senior secondary section.

Co-curricular activities 

Apart from imparting knowledge and wisdom to all its torch bearers, the school also emphasizes co-curricular activities and sports. These are usually inter-house competitions wherein the school is divided into four houses:

 Red House - motto: Pride gears us up for action
 Blue House - motto: Strength gives confidence
 Yellow House - motto: Energetic attitude leads to success
 Green House - motto: Cheerful attitude leads to motivation

Infrastructure 

The school has classrooms, a computer lab, separate labs for physics, chemistry and biology, a hall that holds competitions, yoga and dance classes, a massive playground, a sports room, and a first aid room.

Cultural activities and summer camps take place here.

References

External links 
 School website

International schools in Mumbai
Borivali
Educational institutions established in 1999
1999 establishments in Maharashtra